Cayuga Island is a small island in the Niagara River in Niagara County, New York, a few miles upstream of the Niagara Falls.

Cayuga Creek empties into the river on the north side of the island.  (Note: is not the same Cayuga Creek that flows through Erie County.)

It is part of the LaSalle area of Niagara Falls, New York.  It consists of middle-class housing and a city park.  It was once considered a possible location for the Pan-American Exposition.

References

External links
Topo map of Cayuga Island

Islands of Niagara County, New York
Islands of the Niagara River
River islands of New York (state)
Islands of New York (state)